The bothriodontines are a paraphyletic assemblage of anthracotheres that originated from Eurasia in the late middle Eocene (Bartonian). The group can be distinguished from other anthracothere lineages by their upper molars with the mesostyle that is occupied by the transverse valley, selenodont cusps, ventrally concave symphysis, elongated muzzles, with presence of a diastema between the canine and first premolar. The size range of the group ranged from small, basal forms to larger and more derived forms. During their evolution, the bothriodontines undergone a trend from evolving from small basal forms such as Qatraniodon into larger taxa such as Libycosaurus and Merycopotamus. Some genera the snouts became even more elongated and teeth specialized in a folivorous diet (e.g., Bothriodon, Aepinacodon), while others like Merycopotamus became wide, heavy and shallow muzzles with teeth more adapted for grazing.

References

Anthracotheres
Mammal subfamilies
Eocene first appearances
Paraphyletic groups